Brian Phillip Curran (born November 5, 1963) is a Canadian ice hockey, coach, executive and former player. Curran was born in Toronto, Ontario, but grew up in Veteran, Alberta.

Career
Selected by the Boston Bruins in the 1982 NHL Entry Draft, he played as a defenceman for the Bruins, New York Islanders, Toronto Maple Leafs, Buffalo Sabres, and Washington Capitals in the National Hockey League (NHL).

Coaching career
Following his playing career, Curran got into coaching and was the head coach of Jacksonville of the ECHL in 1998-99 and the Monroe Moccasins of the WPHL in 1999-2000. He was the general manager and head coach of the Quad City Mallards until he resigned on April 26, 2007. Curran was the head coach of the Kalamazoo Wings hockey team in Kalamazoo, Michigan, during the 2007–08 season until he was released on April 8, 2008. On July 9, 2008, he was hired as head coach and general manager of the Brooks Bandits of the Alberta Junior Hockey League. On October 16, 2009, Curran was released from his duties with the Bandits. Curran was introduced as the head coach and general manager of the Lloydminster Bobcats of the Alberta Junior Hockey League on November 25, 2009, a position he  held until he resigned on March 8, 2012. On February 22, 2012, Curran was named the 2011-12 AJHL coach of the year. On March 15, 2012, Curran signed a five-year contract to coach and manage the Drumheller Dragons of the AJHL.

Career statistics

References

External links

Profile at hockeydraftcentral.com

1963 births
Living people
Boston Bruins draft picks
Boston Bruins players
Buffalo Sabres players
Canadian ice hockey defencemen
Cape Breton Oilers players
Hershey Bears players
Ice hockey people from Alberta
Ice hockey people from Toronto
Kalamazoo Wings (1974–2000) players
Monroe Moccasins players
New York Islanders players
Newmarket Saints players
Philadelphia Phantoms players
Portland Pirates players
Portland Winterhawks players
Rochester Americans players
Springfield Indians players
Toronto Maple Leafs players
Utah Grizzlies (IHL) players
Washington Capitals players
Canadian expatriate ice hockey players in the United States